Charles Compton may refer to:

Charles Compton (c. 1624–1661), English MP for Northampton 1661–1662
Charles Compton (MP) (1698–1755), British MP for Northampton 1754–1755 and Envoy to Portugal
Charles Compton, 7th Earl of Northampton (1737–1763), his son, British Ambassador to Venice
Charles Compton, 1st Marquess of Northampton (1760–1828), British MP for Northampton 1784–1796, Lord Lieutenant of Northamptonshire
Charles Douglas-Compton, 3rd Marquess of Northampton (1816–1877), born Charles Compton, British peer